These Helen Hayes Awards are given for non-resident or touring productions for excellence in their productions in the Washington, DC metropolitan area.

Production

Outstanding Touring Production
 1985 Cyrano de Bergerac - The Kennedy Center
 Cats - The National Theatre
 Foolsfire - Arena Stage
 Quilters - The National Theatre
 The Gospel at Colonus - Arena Stage
 Torch Song Trilogy - The Warner Theatre
 1986 La Cage aux Folles - The National Theatre
 Brighton Beach Memoirs - The National Theatre
 Kabuki Medea - American National Theatre
 My One and Only - The Kennedy Center
 Streamers - American National Theatre
 Tent Meeting - The Kennedy Center

Outstanding Production Prior to New York
 1986 The Iceman Cometh - American National Theatre
 Lillian - The Kennedy Center
 Uptown, It's Hot - The Warner Theatre

Outstanding Non-Resident Production
 1987 A Raisin in the Sun - The Kennedy Center
 Broadway Bound - The National Theatre
 Hay Fever - The Kennedy Center
 Les Misérables - The Kennedy Center
 The Tap Dance Kid - The Warner Theatre
 Vienna: Lusthaus - The Kennedy Center
 1988 Joe Turner's Come and Gone - Arena Stage
 All My Sons - Ford's Theatre
 Cabaret - The Kennedy Center
 H.M.S. Pinafore - The Kennedy Center
 Sweet Charity - The National Theatre
 1989 The Search for Signs of Intelligent Life in the Universe - The Kennedy Center
 Ain't Misbehavin - The National Theatre
 Cirque du Soleil - Centre Management
 Driving Miss Daisy - The Kennedy Center
 Me and My Girl - The National Theatre
 Wenceslas Square - The Kennedy Center
 1990 The Road to Mecca - The Kennedy Center
 A Few Good Men - The Kennedy Center
 A Tuna Christmas - The Kennedy Center
 Gypsy - The Kennedy Center
 Largely/New York (The Further Adventures of a Post-Modern Hoofer) - The Kennedy Center
 The Piano Lesson - The Kennedy Center
 1991 From the Mississippi Delta - Arena Stage
 Les Misérables - The National Theatre
 Lend Me a Tenor - The Kennedy Center
 Sarafina! - The Kennedy Center
 Sheila's Day - Ford's Theatre
 The Video Store Owner's Significant Other - American Playwrights Theatre
 1992 Crazy for You - The National Theatre
 Lost in Yonkers - The National Theatre
 The Phantom of the Opera - The Kennedy Center
 Tru - The Kennedy Center
 Two Trains Running - The Kennedy Center
 1993 Richard III - The Kennedy Center
 Buddy: The Buddy Holly Story - The Kennedy Center
 City of Angels - The National Theatre
 Lettice & Lovage - The National Theatre
 The Secret Garden - The Kennedy Center
 1994 3 Hotels - The Kennedy Center
 Guys and Dolls - The Kennedy Center
 Six Degrees of Separation - The National Theatre
 The Kentucky Cycle - The Kennedy Center
 The World Goes 'Round - The Kennedy Center
 1995 The Winter's Tale - The Kennedy Center
 A Room of One's Own - Arena Stage
 Miss Saigon - The Kennedy Center
 Shakespeare for My Father - Ford's Theatre
 The Who's Tommy - The Kennedy Center
 1996 Angels in America, Part 1: Millennium Approaches - The Kennedy Center
 Crazy for You - The Kennedy Center
 Master Class - The Kennedy Center
 Angels in America, Part 2: Perestroika - The Kennedy Center
 Kiss of the Spider Woman, The Musical - The National Theatre
 1997 A Midsummer Night's Dream - The Kennedy Center
 A Huey P. Newton Story - Woolly Mammoth Theatre Company
 Damn Yankees - The Kennedy Center
 Disney's Beauty and the Beast - The Kennedy Center
 Nomathemba - The Kennedy Center
 Stomp - The Warner Theatre
 1998 Chicago - The National Theatre
 Rent - The National Theatre
 Valley Song - The Kennedy Center and the Mark Taper Forum
 Twilight: Los Angeles, 1992 - Ford's Theatre
 Bring in 'da Noise, Bring in 'da Funk - The National Theatre
 1999 Ragtime - The National Theatre
 Hamlet - The Kennedy Center
 Showboat - The Kennedy Center
 The Vagina Monologues - The Studio Theatre
 2 Pianos, 4 Hands - The Kennedy Center
 2000 Cabaret - The Warner Theatre
 Annie Get Your Gun - The Kennedy Center
 Fool Moon - The Kennedy Center
 Side Man - The Kennedy Center
 Red, White and Tuna - The Kennedy Center
 2001 James Joyce's The Dead - The Kennedy Center
 Another American: Asking and Telling - The Studio Theatre
 Blast! - The Kennedy Center
 Fosse - The National Theatre
 It Ain't Nothin' But the Blues - The Kennedy Center
 Wit - The Kennedy Center
 2002 Mill on the Floss - John F. Kennedy Center
 A Servant of Two Masters - John F. Kennedy Center
 Disney's Beauty and the Beast - John F. Kennedy Center
 Fully Committed - Ford's Theatre
 dirty BLONDE - John F. Kennedy Center
 2003 Lypsinka! The Boxed Set - The Studio Theatre
 Copenhagen - The Kennedy Center
 Mamma Mia! - The National Theatre
 Man of La Mancha - The National Theatre
 The Full Monty - The National Theatre

Direction
Outstanding Director of a Non-Resident Production
 1988 Lloyd Richards - Joe Turner's Come and Gone - Arena Stage
 Arvin Brown - All My Sons - Ford's Theatre
 Bob Fosse - Sweet Charity - The National Theatre
 Daniel Sullivan - I'm Not Rappaport - The National Theatre
 Harold Prince - Cabaret - The Kennedy Center
 1989 Jane Wagner - The Search for Signs of Intelligent Life in the Universe - The Kennedy Center
 Jerry Zaks - Wenceslas Square - The Kennedy Center
 Mike Ockrent - Me and My Girl - The National Theatre
 Ron Lagomarsino - Driving Miss Daisy - The Kennedy Center
 Tazewell Thompson - Abyssinia - Arena Stage
 1990 Athol Fugard - The Road to Mecca - The Kennedy Center
 Arthur Laurents - Gypsy - The Kennedy Center
 Bill Irwin - Largely/New York (The Further Adventures of a Post-Modern Hoofer) - The Kennedy Center
 Don Scardino - A Few Good Men - The Kennedy Center
 Lloyd Richards - The Piano Lesson - The Kennedy Center
 1991 Bill Rauch - Video Store Owner's Significant Other - American Playwrights Theatre
 John Caird - Les Misérables - The National Theatre
 Jonathan Wilson - From the Mississippi Delta - Arena Stage
 Mbongeni Ngema - Sarafina! - The Kennedy Center
 Mbongeni Ngema - Sheila's Day - Ford's Theatre
 Trevor Nunn - Les Misérables - The National Theatre
 1992 Lloyd Richards - Two Trains Running - The Kennedy Center
 Gene Saks - Lost in Yonkers - The National Theatre
 Harold Prince - The Phantom of the Opera - The Kennedy Center
 Jay Presson Allen - Tru - The Kennedy Center
 Mike Ockrent - Crazy for You - The National Theatre
 1994''' Joe Mantello - 3 Hotels - The Kennedy Center
 Jerry Zaks - Guys and Dolls - The Kennedy Center
 Jerry Zaks - Six Degrees of Separation - The National Theatre
 Scott Ellis - The World Goes 'Round - The Kennedy Center
 Warner Shook - The Kentucky Cycle'' - The Kennedy Center

See also
Helen Hayes Awards Non-Resident Acting
Helen Hayes Awards Resident Acting
Helen Hayes Awards Resident Design
Helen Hayes Awards Resident Production

Sources
 

Helen Hayes Awards